Daisy Isadora Louise Knatchbull (born 5 October 1992) is a British fashion designer, businesswoman and founder of The Deck, the first female-only tailor on Savile Row.

Early life and family
Knatchbull was born on 5 October 1992 to The Hon. Philip Knatchbull (born 1961) and Atalanta Cowan (born 1962). Her paternal grandparents are Patricia Knatchbull, 2nd Countess Mountbatten of Burma, and John Knatchbull, 7th Baron Brabourne. Her maternal grandfather is photographer John Cowan. She is the great-granddaughter of Louis Mountbatten, 1st Earl Mountbatten of Burma, First Sea Lord and the last Viceroy of India. She has a younger sister Phoebe. Her parents divorced in 2000 and she has two younger half-brothers from her father's second marriage to Wendy Leach (born 1966). Through her father, she is a third cousin of William, Prince of Wales.

Knatchbull was educated at Benenden School and graduated with a Bachelor of Arts in philosophy from the University of Leeds in 2015.

Career
Knatchbull worked as assistant to the fashion director of The Sunday Times Style magazine and as communications director at H. Huntsman & Sons. In 2017, Knatchbull gained press attention for wearing a morning suit in the Royal Enclosure at Royal Ascot.

In 2019, Knatchbull launched The Deck, the first female-only tailor on Savile Row. The Deck has made suits for India Hicks, Sarah, Duchess of York, Adjoa Andoh, Elizabeth Hurley, Jodie Whittaker, Melanie C and Olivia Arben.

References

1992 births
Living people
People educated at Benenden School
Alumni of the University of Leeds
British women fashion designers
21st-century British businesswomen
Daisy